The Hitchhiker Program (HH) was a NASA program established in 1984 and administered by the Goddard Space Flight Center (GSFC) and the Marshall Space Flight Center (MSFC). The program was designed to allow low-cost and quick reactive experiments to be placed on board the Space Shuttle. The program was discontinued after the Space Shuttle Columbia disaster of STS-107.

Program history
NASA's Hitchhiker project began in early 1984. It was created to accommodate small attached payloads in the Space Shuttle payload bay. Hitchhikers were intended for customers whose space activity requires power, data or command services.

The first Hitchhiker launched on STS-61-C on January 12, 1986. Called HHG-1, it was mounted to the side of the payload bay and carried three experiments. The second Hitchhiker launched on STS-39 on April 28, 1991. This payload was called Space Test Payload (STP)-1 and consisted of five experiments mounted onto a cross-bay carrier. Between 1992 and 1995, 12 Hitchhikers were manifested to fly on the Space Shuttle.

The Hitchhiker system provided real-time communications between the payload and customers in the Hitchhiker control center at Goddard Space Flight Center, Greenbelt, Maryland. The system also provided crew control/display capability, if necessary. Hitchhikers were created to provide a quick reaction and low cost capability for flying small payloads in the Shuttle payload bay.

Along with NASA's Get Away Specials (GAS), Hitchhiker was developed and operated by the Goddard Space Flight Center Shuttle Small Payloads Project (SSPP). Unlike Hitchhikers, GAS payloads were only mounted in canisters, did not connect to orbiter electrical services and did not require significant Shuttle support.

Hitchhiker experiments
Hitchhiker experiments were housed in canisters or attached to mounting plates. The Hitchhiker canister came in two varieties—the Hitchhiker Motorized Door Canister and the Sealed Canisters. The Hitchhiker Motorized Door Canister had mechanical interfaces nearly identical to a GAS canister and could accommodate a customer payload of up to 160 pounds (72.6 kilograms). This canister allowed a payload to be exposed directly to the environment of space.

The Sealed Canister, without a door, could accommodate a customer payload up to 200 pounds (90.7 kilograms). The payload in this canister was sealed in an atmosphere of nitrogen or air.

Experiments attached to mounting plates could be placed on the vertical plate, a 25 inches (63.5 centimeters) by 39 inches (99.1 centimeters) mounting surface for up to 200 pounds (90.7 kilograms) of customer hardware. A larger mounting plate measured 50 inches (127 centimeters) by 60 inches (152.4 centimeters). This plate, available for use on the side-mount carrier, was for larger experiments or hardware requirements. Customer hardware mounted on plates may have needed additional customer-provided thermal control provisions, such as heaters or blankets.

List of all Hitchhiker and GAS experiments

Hitchhiker carrier system 

The Hitchhiker carrier system was modular and expandable in accordance with payload requirements. This flexibility allowed maximum efficiency in utilizing orbiter resources and increased the potential for early manifesting on the shuttle.

There were two types of carrier systems—the Hitchhiker Side-Mount Carrier System and the Hitchhiker Cross-Bay Bridge Carrier System. Either system could accept the Hitchhiker canister and the mounting plates.

The Hitchhiker Side-Mount Carrier System used a GAS Adapter Beam for all equipment. The beam attached to the orbiter frame. The side-mount carrier was usually installed in the forward starboard side of the payload bay, although other configurations and locations were possible. This carrier could hold up to three experiments and the Hitchhiker avionics box, which connected the power, data and signal from the shuttle to the experiments.

The Hitchhiker Cross-Bay Carrier could be located anywhere in the payload bay. The carrier could accommodate 11 Hitchhiker canisters or 11 of the smaller mounting plates. There was also room for the necessary avionic units.

Four additional mounting slots were located on the top of the carrier and could accept 33 inch (83.8 centimeter) by 27 inch (68.6 centimeter) pallets or 33 inch (83.8 centimeter) by 55 inch (139.7 centimeter) pallets in any combination with up to 500 pounds (226.8 kilograms) of equipment. Any customer experiments and hardware that could be mounted on the side-mount carrier could also be flown on the cross-bay carrier.

Astronaut involvement
NASA created Hitchhikers to provide customers with a way to send small payloads into orbit on the Space Shuttle. This was done with a short turn-around-time—from manifest to flight took an average of 18 months. To keep the project on schedule, experiments needed to fit in canisters or on mounting plates and meet standard mechanical and electrical interfaces.

Because the payload met these conditions, it also was entitled to special "handling" in the orbiter that other small payloads, like the Get Away Specials did not receive. This special handling included tapping into the Shuttle for power and "astronaut" services," such as requiring specific shuttle attitudes or maneuvers. The orbiter crew moved the Shuttle when necessary to the position needed for the Hitchhiker experiment, provided it did not interfere with the needs of the primary payloads.

Hitchhikers were manifested to fly with primary payloads that either have similar requirements or that will not be affected by the changes in shuttle position necessary to the Hitchhiker experiments. In addition to making adjustments to the orbiter, the astronaut crew participated in the Hitchhiker experiments by controlling the flow of orbiter power on or off using two switches located on the Standard Switch Panel.

The first switch controlled power to the avionics unit. The second switch allowed power to flow from the avionics unit to the experiment. This simple measure allowed the astronauts to have some control over the experiment, in the event of a problem. For some payloads, the crew had a keyboard/display unit, for additional control.

Avionics
Getting the power from the shuttle to the payload required an avionics unit. This unit connected the power from the shuttle to the experiment. The avionics unit also carried the equipment for transmitting the data real-time to the ground control center. The avionics unit also contained the relay switching equipment and had the connections for the customer to use the shuttle television system, and the crew control/display system. Each avionics unit could handle the requirements for six experiments.

The Goddard Connection
Goddard was responsible for the management and operation of the Hitchhiker project through the Shuttle Small Payloads Project. In this capacity Goddard provided the Hitchhiker carriers and the avionics unit.

During the mission, customers used a control center located at Goddard. The customer provided Ground System Equipment (CGSE), software and personnel to generate commands to the payload and display data from the payload during flight, as well as during payload-to-carrier integration and verification testing.

The Hitchhiker carrier system was equipped with a "transparent" data system which allowed customers to easily use their existing ground equipment and software to control their experiments during flight. Data was sent down to the control center in real time, but it also was recorded at Goddard once it reached the ground. The data was transmitted over Goddard's Tracking and Data Relay Satellite System.

See also 
 NASA
 Getaway Special 
 Space Shuttle program

References

Further reading 
 Hitchhiker Program - NASA Fact Sheet
 University of Arizona - Hitchhiker

External links 
 Hitchhiker Ejection System
 Hitchhiker STS-95 Experiments
 Studied the critical viscosity of Xenon-a gas used in flash lamps and ion rocket engines
  Infrared Spectral Imaging Radiometer experiment

NASA programs
Space Shuttle program